The Smallfin worm-eel (Pseudomyrophis micropinna, also known as the Plain worm eel) is an eel in the family Ophichthidae (worm/snake eels). It was described by Charles Barkley Wade in 1946. It is a marine, tropical eel which is known from the eastern central and southeastern Pacific Ocean, including Nicaragua, Colombia, Panama and Costa Rica.

Due to its wide distribution, lack of known threats, and lack of observed population decline, the IUCN redlist currently lists the Smallfin worm-eel as Least Concern.

References

Taxa named by Charles Barkley Wade
Fish described in 1946
Pseudomyrophis